Lazurite is a tectosilicate mineral with sulfate, sulfur and chloride with formula . It is a feldspathoid and a member of the sodalite group. Lazurite crystallizes in the isometric system although well‐formed crystals are rare. It is usually massive and forms the bulk of the gemstone lapis lazuli.

Mineral
Lazurite is a deep‐blue to greenish‐blue. The colour is due to the presence of  anions. It has a Mohs hardness of 5.0 to 5.5 and a specific gravity of 2.4. It is translucent with a refractive index of 1.50. It is fusible at 3.5 on Wolfgang Franz von Kobell's fusibility scale, and soluble in HCl. It commonly contains or is associated with grains of pyrite.

Lazurite is a product of contact metamorphism of limestone and is typically associated with calcite, pyrite, diopside, humite, forsterite, hauyne and muscovite.

Other blue minerals, such as the carbonate azurite and the phosphate lazulite, may be confused with lazurite, but are easily distinguished with careful examination. At one time, lazurite was a synonym for azurite.

Lazurite was first described in 1890 for an occurrence in the Sar-e-Sang District, Koksha Valley, Badakhshan Province, Afghanistan. It has been mined for more than 6,000 years in the lapis lazuli district of Badakhshan. It has been used as a pigment in painting and cloth dyeing since at least the 6th or 7th century. It is also mined at Lake Baikal in Siberia; Mount Vesuvius; Burma; Canada; and the United States. The name is from the Persian  for blue.

Structure 
Lazurite and hauyne seem to have the same structure and both are sulfate-dominant minerals. Lazurite is a pigment (opalescent) and has a bright blue streak (especially as a component of the semiprecious stone lapis lazuli). Many hauynes have a white or pale blue streak and are translucent. The difference might be a consequence of the redox state (sulfate to sulfide ratio).

See also
 Ultramarine

References

External links 
 

Feldspathoid
Sodalite group
Sodium minerals
Calcium minerals
Aluminium minerals
Pigments
Cubic minerals
Minerals in space group 218